The Albarella International Open was a golf tournament on the Challenge Tour, played in Italy. It was held 1998 at Albarella  GC in Venice.

Winners

References

External links
Coverage on the Challenge Tour's official site

Former Challenge Tour events
Golf tournaments in Italy
1998 establishments in Italy
1998 disestablishments in Italy